The Wardlaw-Steele House in Ripley, Tennessee was built in c.1842.  It was listed on the National Register of Historic Places in 1980.

It is a two-story Greek Revival wood-frame building with a two-story portico having six Ionic columns.  It has 14 rooms, with eight fireplaces linked to three large chimneys.

The original part of the house is supported by mortise-and-tenon-connected hand hewn  square beams, and is insulated with raw cotton.  The interior was renovated in Victorian style in about 1887.  The eight fireplaces and mantels vary in style.

References

National Register of Historic Places in Lauderdale County, Tennessee
Houses completed in 1842
Houses on the National Register of Historic Places in Tennessee
Greek Revival architecture in Tennessee
1842 establishments in Tennessee